Olivia Nicole Martins (born November 26, 1991) is a Canadian former competitive ice dancer. She teamed up with Alvin Chau in April 2006. Together, they are the 2010 Canadian junior silver medalists and placed 13th at the 2010 World Junior Championships.

Programs 
(with Chau)

Results

With Chau

With Gagnon

References

External links 
 

Canadian female ice dancers
1991 births
Living people
Figure skaters from Toronto